The Mountain Goats discography includes a number of cassette-only releases from the 1990s, starting with Taboo VI: The Homecoming, the band's first release in 1991.   The following is a list of cassette-only releases by the band.

Taboo VI: The Homecoming

While working as a psychiatric nurse in Southern California, the Mountain Goats frontman John Darnielle purchased a Panasonic boom box from Circuit City and began writing and recording, as well as playing small venues. After completing the album, Darnielle dispersed Taboo VI to his friends; one of which ended up in the hands of Dennis Callaci. It was then released by Callaci under his label Shrimper in 1992. Darnielle had no idea anyone except for his friends would hear Taboo VI: The Homecoming.

John Darnielle had this to say of the cassette:

"When I wrote and recorded Taboo VI, I had no idea that anyone outside
of a few friends would ever hear it; neither did I hope that anyone
outside of those friends would ever express any interest in it. A
couple of the things on it (Going to Alaska, Eleven Bands, Solomon
Revisited, the Hank Williams song) are things I'd stand by if pressed,
though I wish I'd've known how to sing better back when they were
recorded.
While I completely understand the collector's urge, I would
offer the following caveat to anyone trying to hunt down Taboo VI: it's
not what you think it is. Its successor, the Hound Chronicles, represented
an abrupt and total change in direction, and is the stylistic starting
point for all that followed. While I can't and wouldn't disown Taboo VI,
I'd like to offer this note of caution to those who like the later stuff
and are trying to get their hands on my first efforts: you probably won't
like it much, and if you pay an inflated price for it, you'll probably
feel cheated. Having said that, if you still feel inclined to hunt it
down, I do hope that you enjoy it on its own meager terms. It means
well and didn't want to hurt anyone.
Except for maybe that one guy.
I hate that guy."

Track listing.

The Hound Chronicles

The Hound Chronicles is the second cassette-only release of the Mountain Goats, released in 1992 on the Shrimper Records label.  All songs are written by John Darnielle, except "Keep It on Your Mind" by Hank Williams. It was reissued on CD and as a digital download alongside Hot Garden Stomp on July 26, 2012. The song "Going to Kansas" was re-recorded for their 1996 album Nothing for Juice.

Transmissions to Horace

Transmissions to Horace is the third cassette-only release by The Mountain Goats, released in 1993. Each tape features a different cover.  The cassette in its entirety appeared in 1999 as part of Bitter Melon Farm, which was re-released in 2002.

In 2013, it was revealed that additional songs were included in certain copies of the cassette. These songs are early recordings by The Extra Glenns, John Darnielle's other band, some of which possibly predate the recordings of Taboo VI: The Homecoming.

Hot Garden Stomp

Hot Garden Stomp is a 1993 cassette-only release by The Mountain Goats.  All songs by John Darnielle except "Tell Me on a Sunday", written by Andrew Lloyd Webber. It was reissued on CD and as a digital download alongside The Hound Chronicles on July 26, 2012.

Taking the Dative

Taking The Dative is the fifth cassette-only release by The Mountain Goats, released by Car in Car Disco Records in 1994. The cassette in its entirety appeared on their compilation Ghana, which was released in 1999. According to John Darnielle, there is a bonus track on as few as one copy of the cassette, titled "8 to 20 on a Weapons Charge".

Yam, the King of Crops

Yam, the King of Crops is the sixth cassette-only release by the Mountain Goats, released in 1994. It was the last cassette released by the band until 2011, when they released All Survivors Pack as a preorder bonus for All Eternals Deck. It appears in its entirety on the Protein Source of the Future...Now! compilation CD.

The title and lyrics of the song "Two Thousand Seasons" come from the 1973 novel by Ghanaian writer Ayi Kwei Armah.

References

External links
 Complete lyrics to Taboo VI: The Homecoming
 Complete lyrics to The Hound Chronicles
 Complete lyrics to Hot Garden Stomp

The Mountain Goats albums
Lists of albums by artist